Henry Lamartine Hertz (November 19, 1847 – July 3, 1926) was an American businessman and politician.

Biography
Hertz was born in Copenhagen, Denmark,  the son of police inspector  Martin Hertz (1817–79) and Henriette C. C. Frohbøse (1823–1904). He graduated from the University of Copenhagen with a degree in medicine in 1866. In 1869, Hertz emigrated to the United States and settled in Chicago, Illinois. He was involved with banking and financial institutes. He worked in the Cook County, Illinois recorder office and in the criminal court office. In 1876, Hertz was West Town clerk. In 1885, he served as Cook County Coroner and was a Republican. From 1897 to 1899, Hertz served as Illinois Treasurer. He served as chief clerk of the board of review from 1899 to 1901. From 1901 to 1910, Hertz served as collector of the United States Internal Revenue. In 1912, Hertz supported Theodore Roosevelt and the Progressive Party. Hertz died of a heart attack at his home in Chicago, Illinois. Peter B. Olsen, who served in the Illinois General Assembly, was a close associate of Hertz.

Notes

1847 births
1926 deaths
Danish emigrants to the United States
Politicians from Chicago
People from Copenhagen
University of Copenhagen alumni
Businesspeople from Chicago
Illinois Progressives (1912)
Illinois Republicans
County officials in Illinois
State treasurers of Illinois
Cook County Coroners